Barntown is a townland and village in County Wexford, Ireland. Located just outside the boundary of Wexford town, as of the 2016 census, Barntown had a population of 459 people.

The remains of Barntown Castle, a Norman tower house, lie to the east of the village of Barntown. This was built by the Roche family, and was used as a watchtower and storehouse for Ferrycarrig Castle.

St Alphonsus Church is the main church of the parish. It was designed by Augustus Welby Pugin, and built in 1848 by the Very Rev Patrick Murphy.

Barntown was joined with the parish of cummers to found the Cummers-Barntown GAA club in 1885.

References

External links

Official Website 
Three Rocks Trail (archived)

Townlands of County Wexford
Towns and villages in County Wexford